In the comic Oni Double Feature #1, a story titled  "Walt Flanagan's Dog" appears and tells the adventure of Jay and Silent Bob having an encounter with Walt Flanagan's dog, Krypto.

Plot

While Jay and Silent Bob deal outside RST Video, Randal Graves calls the cops on them. The duo leaves and ends up smoking marijuana with Walt Flanagan's dog (Flanagan and Steve Dave are practicing strip comic book trivia at the time). The dog gets a "stoner boner" and chases them around New Jersey after Silent Bob pokes it. By the time the dog calms down, it is dawn. Jay and Bob then decide to go to the Eden Prairie Mall for an Orange Julius.

In the Askewniverse
Chronologically, "Walt Flanagan's Dog" is the earliest story to take place in the View Askewniverse. It leads into Mallrats which takes place before Clerks.

Askewniverse references

 The comic features a strip where there is an ambulance in front of the local YMCA. This is a reference to Julie Dwyer's death, which is mentioned in Clerks, Mallrats and Chasing Amy.
 Dante Hicks is talking to Veronica, his girlfriend from Clerks, on the phone in the beginning of the comic. They discuss a game show at the Eden Prairie Mall, a reference to Mallrats.
 In Mallrats, Jay refers to the events of the comic after being chased by Lafours, saying he is "faster than Walt Flanagan's dog".
 One of the usernames on an early internet message board shown in a flashback in Jay & Silent Bob's Super Groovy Cartoon Movie is "Walt Flanagan's Dog".
 One of the usernames on an internet message board shown in  Jay & Silent Bob Strike Back is "Walt Flanagan's Dog".
 While not technically in the Askewniverse, the View Askew film Vulgar contains the line "Only humans can be heroes, right? Well tell that to Walt Flanagan's Dog".

View Askewniverse comics
Oni Press titles